A Thief in Paradise is a 1925 American silent drama film produced by Samuel Goldwyn, directed by George Fitzmaurice, and adapted by Frances Marion from Leonard Merrick's 1900 novel The Worldlings.

Plot
Ronald Colman stars as Maurice Blake in this 1925 movie. Co-star Charles Youree plays the role of Philip Jardine, the wayward son of a San Francisco millionaire. The men are part-time pearl fishers on a tropical island and, during an underwater fight for a pearl, Jardine is attacked and killed by a shark. After his death, Aileen Pringle playing the role of Rosa Carmino, informs Blake that she has a letter from Jardine's wealthy father, urging him to return to San Francisco. The envelope containing the letter includes $500 to pay for transportation. Carmino, knowing that Jardine's father has never seen his fully grown son, implores Blake to impersonate him. The two thieves, as they are alluded to in the movie's title, arrive in San Francisco and are welcomed by the Jardine family. Soon, Blake falls in love with a neighbor named Helen played by Doris Kenyon. Carmino, jealous of the affair, is paid off by Blake to maintain her silence. However, after Blake marries Helen, Carmino tells Helen the true story. Blake admits the truth to Helen and despondent, tries to kill himself. Helen, in love with Blake, refuses to leave him and instead nurses him back to health. As the movie ends, the elder Jardine improbably accepts Blake as his step son and Carmino returns to her native island.

Cast

Production
The movie was praised by critics for its filming of the underwater fight scene between Blake and Jardine, an impressive technological feat at the time the movie was made, as well for its lavish sets. Another scene that captured the attention of critics was a polo match, organized by the hosts of a garden party, that featured a team of barefoot blondes wearing one piece bathing suits playing a team of brunettes attired in the same manner.

”A feature of this chapter is a polo game played by women in bathing suits. The guests are all the more thrilled by making it a contest between blondes and brunettes. Now this may be wandering away from the narrative, but who will say such a game lacks interest?”

The director, George Fitzmaurice, said in an interview after the movie was completed, that he was surprised at the athleticism of brunettes compared to blondes whom he had long regarded as athletically superior to dark haired women.

Preservation
With no prints of A Thief in Paradise located in any film archives, it is a lost film.

See also
 List of lost films
 Blonde versus brunette rivalry

References

External links

Poster and stills at silenthollywood.com
Southseascinema.org (a webpage on island oriented films)

1925 films
American black-and-white films
1925 drama films
Lost American films
Silent American drama films
American silent feature films
Films directed by George Fitzmaurice
First National Pictures films
Samuel Goldwyn Productions films
Films with screenplays by Frances Marion
American remakes of British films
Films based on British novels
1925 lost films
Lost drama films
1920s American films
1920s English-language films